Chariot is the debut studio album by singer-songwriter Gavin DeGraw, first released on July 22, 2003, on J Records. It was re-released in 2004 as Chariot (Stripped), which included all of the original Chariot content as well as a bonus disc. The bonus material was "stripped-down" (made simply and with minimal instrumentation) studio recordings of all of the original songs, as well as a cover of Sam Cooke's "Change is Gonna Come." The album was successful and was later certified Platinum in the United States.

Track listing 
All songs written by Gavin DeGraw, except "Change Is Gonna Come" (for Stripped disc only) by Sam Cooke.

Original release 
 Produced by Mark Endert
 "Follow Through" – 3:59
 "Chariot" – 3:59
 "Just Friends" – 3:25
 "(Nice to Meet You) Anyway" – 3:45
 "Chemical Party" – 3:01
 "Belief" – 4:27
 "Crush" – 3:25
 "I Don't Want to Be" – 3:39
 "Meaning" – 3:35
 "More Than Anyone" – 2:57
 "Over-Rated" – 4:11

Stripped disc 
 Produced by James Diener
 "Follow Through" – 4:28
 "Chariot" – 4:59
 "Just Friends" – 4:49
 "(Nice to Meet You) Anyway" – 4:46
 "Chemical Party" – 4:54
 "Belief" – 3:09
 "Crush" – 3:20
 "I Don't Want to Be" – 4:04
 "Meaning" – 3:41
 "More Than Anyone" – 3:50
 "Over-Rated" – 6:22
 "Change Is Gonna Come" – 12:27

Personnel 

 Alli – Art Direction, Design
 David Ashton – Assistant Engineer
 C.J. Buscaglia – Assistant Engineer
 Andrea Cooker – Stylist
 Kevin Dean – Assistant Engineer
 Gavin DeGraw – Piano, Keyboards, Vocals, Cover Art Concept
 James Diener – A&R
 Mark Endert – Producer, Engineer, Mixing
 Steve Gryphon – Programming, Editing
 Tosh Kasai – Assistant Engineer
 Tim LeBlanc – Assistant Engineer
 George Marino – Mastering
 Michael McCoy – Overdub Engineer
 Alvin Moody – Bass
 MiMi "Audio" Parker – Assistant Engineer
 Chris Reynolds – Assistant Engineer
 Maria Santana – Set Design
 Steven Sebring – Photography
Michael Ward – Guitar
Joey Waronker – Drums
 Patrick Warren – Organ, Harmonium, String Arrangements

Charts

Weekly charts

Year-end charts

Certifications

References

External links 
 
 More Than a Memory: The Official Gavin DeGraw fansite

Gavin DeGraw albums
2003 debut albums
J Records albums